This is a list of franchise records for the New Jersey Devils of the National Hockey League.

Career regular season leaders

Skaters

Goaltenders
 Minimum 50 games

 Minimum 50 games

Single season records

Skaters

Goaltenders

Career playoff leaders

Skaters

Goaltenders

Team records
 Most consecutive wins in a season: 13 (2000–01) (2022–23)
 Most points in a season: 111 (2000–01)
 Most wins in a season: 51 (2008–09)
 Longest season-ending win streak: 11 (2005–06) (also an NHL record)

References

Records
records
National Hockey League statistical records